The Harwell-Boeing file format (also known as HB format ) is a file format designed to store information  used to describe sparse matrices.

See also 
 Matrix Market exchange formats

External links 
 HB Files Harwell Boeing Sparse Matrix File Format a detailed description of the HB format

Computer file formats